The 5th Filipino Academy of Movie Arts and Sciences Awards Night was held inn 1957 for the Outstanding Achievements for 1956 at Fiesta Pavilion in Manila Hotel.

Desperado of Peoples Picture ran away with the most wins (4) out of 11 nominations. However, it was Luksang Tagumpay by (LVN Pictures) who won the FAMAS Award for Best Picture.

Awards

Major Awards
Winners are listed first and highlighted with boldface.

Special Awardee

International Prestige Award of Merit
Badjao (LVN Pictures)

References

External links
FAMAS Awards 

FAMAS Award
FAMAS
FAMAS